Trai Hume (born 18 March 2002) is a Northern Irish professional footballer who plays as a defender for Sunderland and the Northern Ireland national under-21 football team. He previously played for Linfield and Ballymena United.

Early and personal life
Hume attended Slemish College in Ballymena and the NIFL Academy.

Club career
Hume played youth football for Ballymena United and Linfield. He signed a professional contract with Linfield in January 2019 until the end of the 2020–21 season. Hume made his first team debut for Linfield as a substitute in a 5-1 NIFL Premiership win against Cliftonville on 23 April 2019. On 7 September 2020 he agreed two-year contract extension with Linfield.

On 11 September 2020, Hume signed a season-long loan deal with his hometown club Ballymena United. He made his debut for the Sky Blues in a 1–0 NIFL Premiership win against Coleraine on 16 October 2020. He made a total of 37 appearances in all competitions for Ballymena, scoring six goals.

He returned to Linfield for the 2021–22 season and played in the qualifying rounds for both the UEFA Champions League and UEFA Europa Conference League, establishing himself as the club's first-choice right back.

Hume scored his first goal for Linfield in a 3–0 NIFL Premiership win against Glentoran on 28 September 2021. He also scored in his final game for the club against Dungannon Swifts on 1 January 2022.

On 4 January 2022, Hume signed for EFL League One club Sunderland on a four-and-a-half-year contract for an undisclosed fee. He made a total of 31 appearances in all competitions for Linfield, scoring three goals. He made his debut for Sunderland in a 2–1 EFL League One defeat to Cheltenham Town on 8 February 2022.

International career
Hume has played for Northern Ireland at under-17, under-19 and under-21 youth levels. He was sent-off in a 2-0 2023 UEFA European Under-21 Championship qualification defeat against Malta on 16 November 2021.

Hume was called up to the senior Northern Ireland squad in March 2022. He made his debut in a 1–0 friendly defeat against Hungary.

Career statistics

Honours
Sunderland
 EFL League One play-offs: 2022

References

2002 births
Living people
Association footballers from Northern Ireland
Northern Ireland under-21 international footballers
Linfield F.C. players
Ballymena United F.C. players
Sunderland A.F.C. players
People from Ballymena
Association football defenders
NIFL Premiership players
English Football League players
Northern Ireland international footballers